The Pool of the 2009 Fed Cup Asia/Oceania Zone Group II composed of four teams competing in a round robin competition. The top two teams qualifying for Group I next year.

Hong Kong vs. Iran

Kazakhstan vs. Singapore

Hong Kong vs. Singapore

Kazakhstan vs. Iran

Hong Kong vs. Kazakhstan

Singapore vs. Iran

  advanced to Group I for 2010, where they placed third overall.

See also
 Fed Cup structure

References

External links
 Fed Cup website

2006 Fed Cup Asia/Oceania Zone